Praana (Seeds) is a 2022 Sri Lankan trilingual drama film directed by Sanjaya Nirmal and produced by Janaka Perera. The film stars Shyam Fernando, Niranjani Shanmugaraja, Darshan Dharmaraj in lead roles, whereas Nita Fernando and King Ratnam made supportive roles. The film is based on the true story of the Great Catholic Christian Massacre of nearly 700 Christians that took place in 1544 in Mannar and the chain of events related to the same massacre that took place in 1560.

The film will be the first film to be released in Sinhala, English and Tamil languages at the same period in Sri Lanka.

Cast
 Shyam Fernando as Catholic priest
 Darshan Dharmaraj as Cankili king
 Niranjani Shanmugaraja as Cankili queen
 Nita Fernando as nun
 King Ratnam
 Tray Hicks as Dom Constantino
 Steven Mark Lordsic
 Robert Siera
 Peter Satternitez
 Kalpa Munasinghe
 Dinesh De Silva
 Pahandi Taraka
 Kapil Galappatti
 Chandra Hassan
 Senesh Dissanayake Bandara
 Wageesha Salgadu
 Mohan Sharma
 GA Shahis
 Vidura Lakthilaka
 Ajran Seneviratne
 John Bosco
 Michael Collin

Production
The film marked the sixth cinema direction by Sanjaya Nirmal, after the films: Samaara, Rosa Kale, July Hathai, Swara and Aale Corona. The film was edited by Shaan Alwis, music direction by Nadeeka Guruge and the production coordination is done by Fr Antony Nishan and Ranjan Prasanna. Dhammika Hewaduwatta is the art director and Buwaneka Ranawaka is the costume designer, Priyantha Samarakoon is the assistant director. Striner Adams worked as the cinematographer and Gayan Kosala is the production manager. Shashin Gimhan Perera is in charge of the sound effects whereas Suneth Malinga Lokuhewa is the production manager. The social media launch of the film was held in January 2022 at Thottaweli, Mannar at the burial site where those 700 Christian murdered by Tamil Cankili king.

References

External links
 Official trailer- Sinhala
 Official trailer- English

2022 films
2020s Sinhala-language films
2022 thriller films
Sri Lankan thriller films
Sri Lankan Tamil-language films
2022 multilingual films